This is a list of diplomatic missions of Honduras, excluding honorary consulates. Honduras is a Central American country.

Americas

 Buenos Aires (Embassy)

 Belize City (Embassy)

 Brasília (Embassy)

 Ottawa (Embassy)
 Montreal (Consulate-General)

 Santiago (Embassy)

 Bogotá (Embassy)

 San José (Embassy)

 Havana (Embassy)

 Santo Domingo (Embassy)

 Quito (Embassy)

 San Salvador (Embassy)

 Guatemala City (Embassy)

 Mexico City (Embassy)
 Puebla City (Consulate-General)
 San Luis Potosí (Consulate-General)
 Tapachula (Consulate-General)
 Tijuana (Consulate-General)
 Veracruz (Consulate-General)
 Acayucan (Consular Agency)
 Saltillo (Consular Agency)
 Tenosique (Consular Agency)

 Managua (Embassy)

 Panama City (Embassy)

 Lima (Embassy)

 Washington, D.C. (Embassy)
 Atlanta (Consulate-General)
 Boston (Consulate-General)
 Charlotte (Consulate-General)
 Chicago (Consulate-General)
 Dallas (Consulate-General)
 Houston (Consulate-General)
 Los Angeles (Consulate-General)
 McAllen (Consulate-General)
 Miami (Consulate-General)
 New Orleans (Consulate-General)
 New York City (Consulate-General)
 San Francisco (Consulate-General)
 Seattle (Consulate-General)

Asia

 Jerusalem (Embassy)

 Tokyo (Embassy)

 Kuwait (Embassy)

 Seoul (Embassy)

 Taipei (Embassy)

Europe

 Vienna (Embassy)

 Brussels (Embassy)

 Paris (Embassy)

 Berlin (Embassy)

 Rome (Embassy)

 Rome (Embassy)

 Moscow (Embassy)

 Madrid (Embassy)
 Barcelona (Consulate-General)

 London (Embassy)

Multilateral organizations
 
Brussels (Mission to the European Union)
 
Geneva (Permanent Mission to the United Nations and international organizations)
New York (Permanent Mission)
 
Paris (Permanent Mission)
  Food and Agriculture Organization
Rome (Permanent Mission)
 
Washington, D.C. (Permanent Mission)

Gallery

See also
 Foreign relations of Honduras
 List of diplomatic missions in Honduras

Notes

References
 Ministry of Foreign Affairs of Honduras

 
Diplomatic missions
Honduras